Hoopla is the second solo album by Speech, an American rapper known for his work with Arrested Development. It was released on August 3, 1999, on TVT Records.

Critical reception

Hoopla received mixed reviews from critics. For example, Rob Brunner gave the album a C, and described it as a "lightweight retread," "sometimes silly," and "occasionally awful." The Los Angeles Times Soren Baker was more favorable in his review, giving it a 3 out of 4 star rating and writing that "A comfortable, funky mix of guitars, keyboards and backup singing gives the album a relaxed feel."

Track listing
Do You Know How To Get To Highway 85 (Skit) – 0:45
Clocks In Sync With Mine – 5:37
The Hey Song – 4:50
I Think Yin Is Having A Baby, But I Don't Know (Skit) – 0:22
Our Image – 5:55
Movin' On – 3:52
Which Radio Station Has The Guts (Skit) – 0:16
The Mountain Of Lonely – 6:04
Are You Still With Me – 0:13
Slave Of It All – 5:53
Leave A Message... Bye Bye (Skit) – 0:13
Sumtimes I Do – 5:11
Yeah Yeah – 5:15
Real Love – 5:28
Shut Down Our Mind Machine – 1:04
The List Goes On – 4:58
Redemption Song – 6:14
If Life Is A River – 4:28
The Hey Song (Remix) Another Perspective – 4:15

References

1999 albums
TVT Records albums